tinyBuild Inc. is an American publisher of indie games based in Bellevue, Washington. The company was established by Alex Nichiporchik and Tom Brien in 2011 to expand Brien's game No Time to Explain into a commercial release. Building from the success of the game's Steam release in 2013, tinyBuild partnered with DoubleDutch Games for the development and release of SpeedRunners, which landed tinyBuild further publishing deals. Since March 2020, the company has been founding or acquiring new studios to expand. It became a public company on the Alternative Investment Market in March 2021.

History 
tinyBuild was founded in 2011 by Alex Nichiporchik and Tom Brien. Nichiporchik came from Latvia and had been a professional Warcraft III: Reign of Chaos player in the early 2000s, which made him enough money to drop out of high school and pursue a career in video game journalism. While an employee of Spil Games in the Netherlands in 2010, he became interested in Flash games. He came across Super Meat Boy, which led to him to want to get into the business. Nichiporchik discovered No Time to Explain, a Flash game by Tom Brien, which he thought could be as successful as Super Meat Boy. Nichiporchik and Brien established tinyBuild in 2011 as a developer to expand No Time to Explain into a commercial release. The company headquarters were based in the Netherlands with Nichiporchik until both relocated to Seattle later on.

tinyBuild launched a crowdfunding campaign for the game via Kickstarter and raised  from a  target. tinyBuild had agreed with the Russian publisher Buka Entertainment that the latter would publish retail versions of No Time to Explain in Russia, get the game released on Steam, and grant tinyBuild  in royalties in advance. However, Buka Entertainment failed to communicate with tinyBuild until stating that it was forced to cancel the project, withholding the royalties. As No Time to Explain could not be launched via Steam, tinyBuild released it independently. The game recouped its development cost but did not turn a significant profit. tinyBuild went into hiatus for nearly a year thereafter until Steam introduced the Greenlight process for game approval. No Time to Explain became one of the first games to be greenlit for Steam in 2013 and had a successful release on the platform. Nichiporchik stated this experience burnt out tinyBuild, which was no longer interested in pursuing development but did not want to waste the newfound success. The company invested in, co-developed, and published the game SpeedRunners, which led to more developers pitching their games to tinyBuild, incrementally turning the company into a publisher. To expand its publishing operations, it hired the video game journalist Mike Rose in December 2014.

The company established its first internal studio, HakJak Studios, with Guts and Glory developer Jed "HakJak" Steen in Boise, Idaho, in March 2020. Nichiporchik believed that indie game publishers like tinyBuild would have to move away from "transactional relationships"—wherein the developer and publisher would work on one game and then move on—and instead build long-term relationships with the developers. At this time, tinyBuild had 150 employees. tinyBuild acquired the development team behind Hello Neighbor from Dynamic Pixels in July 2020 for an undisclosed sum to establish the studio Eerie Guest Studios in Hilversum. The company invested more than  into the Hello Neighbor franchise. tinyBuild invested  into Hologryph in November 2020, assigned the studio to the Hello Neighbor spinoff Secret Neighbor. In February 2021, tinyBuild acquired three studios it had previously worked with: We're Five Games, Hungry Couch, and Moon Moose.

tinyBuild announced in February 2021 that it was to pursue an initial public offering on the Alternative Investment Market of the London Stock Exchange with the ticker symbol "TBLD". At the time, Nichiporchik owned 61.1% of the company, while the Chinese company NetEase owned 14.3%.

tinyBuild acquired Versus Evil and Red Cerberus in November 2021.

Studios

Games developed

Games published

References

External links 
 

2011 establishments in Washington (state)
2021 initial public offerings
American companies established in 2011
Companies based in Bellevue, Washington
Companies listed on the Alternative Investment Market
Video game companies established in 2011
Video game companies of the United States
Video game development companies
Video game publishers